Mahfuz bin Omar (Jawi: محفوظ بن عمر; born 25 August 1957) is a Malaysian politician who served as Deputy Minister of Human Resources in the Pakatan Harapan (PH) administration under former Prime Minister Mahathir Mohamad and former Minister M. Kulasegaran from July 2018 to the collapse of the PH administration in February 2020 as well as the Member of Parliament (MP) for Pokok Sena from November 1999 to March 2004 and again from March 2008 to November 2022. He is a member of National Trust Party (AMANAH), a component party of the PH coalition.

Political career

Mahfuz was the head of Pan-Malaysian Islamic Party (PAS) youth wing from 1999 to 2003. Under his leadership, PAS Youth was a progressive voice within PAS, advocating for the party to join the Barisan Alternatif coalition with the Democratic Action Party (DAP) and the People's Justice Party (PKR). Mahfuz's leadership of PAS was the culmination of a long period of his activism within the party. He and a group of other PAS politicians were detained under the Internal Security Act in 1985, a period of intense and often violent hostility between PAS and the governing United Malays National Organisation (UMNO). He was briefly jailed again in 2000 for participating in an unauthorised protest rally against an Israeli cricket team visiting Malaysia.

Mahfuz was elected to Parliament in 1999 but was defeated in the 2004 election by Abdul Rahman Ibrahim of the governing Barisan Nasional coalition. Mahfuz won back the seat at the 2008 election with a majority of 5,371 votes. He was re-elected in 2013, while all other PAS parliamentary candidates in Kedah were defeated.

On 30 December 2017, Mahfuz had announced his decision to quit PAS which he had joined 34 years ago on 12 March 1984. On 15 March 2018, Mahfuz declared he had joined AMANAH, a splinter party of PAS.

In the 2018 general election, Mahfuz again retained the Pokok Sena seat but as the AMANAH of Pakatan Harapan candidate for the first time.

Election results

Honours
  :
  Knight Companion of the Order of Loyalty to the Royal House of Kedah (DSDK) – Dato' (2009)
  Knight Commander of the Order of the Crown of Kedah (DGMK) – Dato' Wira (2019)

See also
Pokok Sena (federal constituency)

References

Living people
1957 births
People from Kedah
Malaysian people of Malay descent
Malaysian Muslims
Former Malaysian Islamic Party politicians
Members of the Dewan Rakyat
21st-century Malaysian politicians
National Trust Party (Malaysia) politicians